The America Zone was one of the two regional zones of the 1937 International Lawn Tennis Challenge.

4 teams entered the America Zone, with the winner going on to compete in the Inter-Zonal Final against the winner of the Europe Zone. The United States defeated Australia in the final, and went on to face Germany in the Inter-Zonal Final.

Draw

Semifinals

Mexico vs. Australia

United States vs. Japan

Final

United States vs. Australia

References

External links
Davis Cup official website

Davis Cup Americas Zone
America Zone
International Lawn Tennis Challenge